Pila may refer to:

Yom language or Pilapila, is a Gur language of Benin.
Maia language, a Papuan language of Madang Province, Papua New Guinea